The 1977 Grote Prijs Jef Scherens was the 13th edition of the Grote Prijs Jef Scherens cycle race and was held on 18 September 1977. The race started and finished in Leuven. The race was won by Walter Planckaert.

General classification

References

1977
1977 in road cycling
1977 in Belgian sport